Sakin Sarisuri is a Bangladeshi drama television series that aired on Channel i from January 27, 2009, to 2010. It was written by Brindaban Das and directed by Salauddin Lavlu, and has 102 episodes.

The series is set on a village where thieves reside, and is home to Muslims, Hindus, and Christians who all live in harmony. Eventually, the village runs into a conflict when the daughter of Mondol, a local 'godfather', falls in love with a thief.

Cast
 Mosharraf Karim as Ruiton
 Masum Aziz as Moga Sardar
 Nazmul Huda Bachchu as Shadan Das
 Golam Farida Chhanda as Basonti Rani
 Chanchal Chowdhury as Japan Doctor
 AKM Hasan as Ranju 
 Azizul Hakim as Guru Das
 Rawnak Hasan as Golam
 Wahida Mollick Jolly as Kohinoor Begum
 Shatabdi Wadud as Hasu
 Ahsanul Haque Minu
 Masuma Mithi as Kasturi
 Niba Rani 
 Mamunur Rashid as Mondol
 Shanarei Debi Shanu as the mother of Rabi
 Shimana as Kakoli
 Silvi
 Kazi Anisul Haque Borun as Mannan
 Habibur Rahman Modhu as Jongson
 Masud Rana Mithu as Hannan
 M M Morshed as Rowshan
 Selina Akther Shikha as Shefali
 Muntasir Saju as Reegan

Production
The serial was filmed in Bhadun, Pubail, at that time a rural area in Gazipur Sadar Upazila.

Themes
According to the director:

References

2009 telenovelas
2009 Bangladeshi television series debuts
2000s Bangladeshi television series
Bangladeshi drama television series
Bengali-language television programming in Bangladesh
Channel i original programming